The Paleo-Corsican language is an extinct language (or perhaps set of languages) spoken in Corsica and presumably in the northeastern part of Sardinia (corresponding to today's historical region of Gallura) by the ancient Corsi populations during the Bronze and Iron Ages. The scanty evidence of the language, which comes mainly from toponymy, would indicate a type of Pre-Indo-European language or, according to others, Indo-European, with Ligurian and Iberian affinity.

Antoine Peretti, claiming the presence of different linguistic areas, ranks as Ligurian some suffixes appearing in Corsican place names, like -asco, -elo/-ello, -ate/-ati and -inco.

See also
Paleo-Sardinian language
List of ancient Corsican and Sardinian tribes

References

Bibliography 
 

Extinct languages
Unclassified languages of Europe